The Aduunchuluun Coal Mine, also written as "Aduun Chuluun" coal mine (horses' rock) is a coal mine located next to Choibalsan city in Dornod aimag of eastern Mongolia. The mine has an annual production capacity of 0.6 million tonnes of coal. Owner is the Mongolyn Alt Corporation (MAK).

References 

Coal mines in Mongolia